Anton Alexeyevich Volchenkov (born 25 February 1982) is a Russian professional ice hockey defenceman who is currently an unrestricted free agent. He most recently played for Torpedo Nizhny Novgorod of the Kontinental Hockey League (KHL).

Playing career
 Volchenkov grew up in Moscow and began attending the CSKA hockey school at the age of six. Around time when he was in fourth grade, his family moved to Kyiv, Ukraine and he began attending the Sokil Kyiv hockey school, as his uncle became the director of that school. After a year in Kyiv, Volchenkov returned to the CSKA program in Moscow.

Volchenkov was drafted by the Ottawa Senators in the first round as the 21st overall selection in the 2000 NHL Entry Draft. In the 2002–03 NHL season, he came to North America and played the entire season with the Senators. He is known for his fearless attitude towards other players and the puck, and is generally considered to be amongst the toughest players in the league. In a game against the Boston Bruins, on 8 December 2003, he suffered a shoulder injury and took the majority of the 2003–04 season to recover.

In his early days playing in Europe, he played goaltender. However, his coach instructed him to play defence, which may help explain why he led the NHL in blocked shots in 2006–07 by a large margin. He is consistently amongst the top shot blockers and hitters. Volchenkov was voted as the fifth-best defensive defenceman by The Hockey News in June 2007. With the defensive help of Volchenkov and Phillips, the Senators made their 2007 Stanley Cup run to the finals, where they were defeated by the Anaheim Ducks in another five-game series. Volchenkov also led the league in shots blocked during the 2007 playoffs.

After his first stint in Ottawa, he became a regular in the Senators' starting line-up. As a stay-at-home defenceman, he is known primarily for his blocked shots and massive hits. He was considered to be among Ottawa's top two defenders, along with Chris Phillips. On 9 April 2007, Volchenkov announced he would be staying with the Senators, signing a three-year deal. Ottawa's General Manager John Muckler said, "Anton has been one of our top defencemen all season."

In a regular season game against the Nashville Predators, on 29 November 2007, he suffered a broken finger in an attempt to block a shot. He would come back after missing 15 games. In the 2008 playoffs against the Pittsburgh Penguins, Volchenkov fell in front of the net and was struck in the face by a puck, suffering a laceration. He returned the following game, and finished the series with one assist, one penalty, and one shot in four games.

On 1 July 2010, Volchenkov signed a six-year, $25.5 million contract with the New Jersey Devils.

After four seasons played into his six-year contract, the Devils placed Volchenkov on unconditional waivers for purpose of a buyout, on 30 June 2014. As a free agent on 7 July 2014, he was signed to a one-year $1 million contract by the Nashville Predators.

International play

In the early days of his hockey career, he captained the 2001 Russian World Junior Hockey team to a championship in which he scored the winning goal against Team Canada, catching the attention of many pro scouts. Throughout 2001-2003, he was mentored by James "JP" Kunda.

Volchenkov has also played for team Russia in the 2006 Winter Olympics, the 2010 Winter Olympics, and in the 2009 IIHF World Championship.

Personal life
After playing as a goaltender when he began playing hockey as a child, Volchenkov was switched to defence by his coach. He has been among the NHL league leaders in blocked shots since the 2005–06 season. Volchenkov's father Alexei was a defenceman on the Red Army hockey team during the 1975 Super Series.

Volchenkov has two sons and a daughter, The firstborn Anton Jr. was born on 5 October 2003, and on 20 February 2011, he welcomed twins, a boy and a girl named Milan & Milena.

Career statistics

Regular season and playoffs

International

References

External links

 

1982 births
Living people
Admiral Vladivostok players
Binghamton Senators players
HC CSKA Moscow players
Ice hockey people from Moscow
Ice hockey players at the 2006 Winter Olympics
Ice hockey players at the 2010 Winter Olympics
Krylya Sovetov Moscow players
National Hockey League first-round draft picks
New Jersey Devils players
Olympic ice hockey players of Russia
Ottawa Senators draft picks
Ottawa Senators players
Nashville Predators players
Russian expatriate sportspeople in Ukraine
Russian ice hockey defencemen
Torpedo Nizhny Novgorod players